The Canadian Open, is an annual bonspiel, or curling tournament. It is one of the seven Grand Slams and four "majors" on the World Curling Tour, and the only one to use a triple knockout format. A women's event was introduced in the 2014–15 curling season. In 2021, when it was supposed to be held outside of Canada for the first time, it was going to just be called the Open. However, the event was not held in 2021 and 2022 due to the COVID-19 pandemic. In 2023, the event was named the Co-op Canadian open for sponsorship reasons.

The event features 16 men's and women's teams. The top seven teams on the World Curling Tour Order of Merit ranking and the top seven on the WCT Year-to-date ranking qualify, plus the winner of the previous Tour Challenge Tier 2 event plus a sponsor's exemption.

The event has had its current format since 2014.

Event names
Telus Canadian Open: 2001
M&M Meat Shops Canadian Open: 2002
Canadian Open: 2003, 2005
BDO Classic Canadian Open: 2006, 2007 (Dec)
BDO Classic Canadian Open of Curling: 2007 (Jan)
BDO Canadian Open of Curling: 2009–2011
Canadian Open of Curling: 2012
Canadian Open: 2013–2014
Meridian Canadian Open: 2015-2020
Meridian Open: 2021
Co-op Canadian Open: 2023

Past champions

Men

Women

References

External links
Official site

 
Men's Grand Slam (curling) events
Women's Grand Slam (curling) events
Annual sporting events in Canada